Alexander James Gregory (born 27 June 1995) is a cricketer who played for South Australia. He made his one day debut on 22 July 2014 for the Australia National Performance Squad against Australia A, as part of the Australia A Team Quadrangular Series in 2014. He was educated at Scotch College and St Peter's  College in Adelaide.

References

External links

Living people
1995 births
Cricketers from South Australia
South Australia cricketers
Cricket Australia XI cricketers